Ochrosia oppositifolia grows as a small to medium-sized tree up to  tall, with a trunk diameter of up to . Its flowers feature a creamy to white corolla. Its habitat is coastal forest, bush or open areas to  altitude, rarely inland. Local medicinal uses include as a carminative and in high doses as an abortifacient. Ochrosia oppositifolia is native to regions from the Seychelles through tropical Asia to the Pacific.

Oppositines are vasorelaxant beta-carbolines isolated from Ochrosia oppositifolia.

References

oppositifolia
Plants used in traditional African medicine
Chagos Archipelago
Trees of Seychelles
Trees of Indo-China
Trees of Malesia
Trees of Papuasia
Trees of the Pacific
Plants described in 1783